In mathematics, the Markus–Yamabe conjecture is a conjecture on global asymptotic stability. If the Jacobian matrix of a dynamical system at a fixed point is Hurwitz, then the fixed point is asymptotically stable. Markus-Yamabe conjecture asks if a similar result holds globally. Precisely, the conjecture states that if a continuously differentiable map on an -dimensional real vector space has a fixed point, and its Jacobian matrix is everywhere Hurwitz, then the fixed point is globally stable.

The conjecture is true for the two-dimensional case. However, counterexamples have been constructed in higher dimensions. Hence, in the two-dimensional case only, it can also be referred to as the Markus–Yamabe theorem.

Related mathematical results concerning global asymptotic stability, which are applicable in dimensions higher than two, include various autonomous convergence theorems. Analog of the conjecture for nonlinear control system with scalar nonlinearity is known as Kalman's conjecture.

Mathematical statement of conjecture 
Then  is a global attractor of the dynamical system .

References
 L. Markus and H. Yamabe, "Global Stability Criteria for Differential Systems", Osaka Math J. 12:305–317 (1960)
 Gary Meisters, A Biography of the Markus–Yamabe Conjecture (1996)
 C. Gutierrez, "A solution to the bidimensional Global Asymptotic Stability Conjecture", Ann. Inst. H. Poincaré Anal. Non Linéaire 12: 627–671 (1995).
 R. Feßler, "A proof of the two-dimensional Markus–Yamabe stability conjecture and a generalisation", Ann. Polon. Math. 62:45–74 (1995)
 A. Cima et al., "A Polynomial Counterexample to the Markus–Yamabe Conjecture", Advances in Mathematics 131(2):453–457 (1997)
 Josep Bernat and Jaume Llibre, "Counterexample to Kalman and Markus–Yamabe Conjectures in dimension larger than 3", Dynam. Contin. Discrete Impuls. Systems 2(3):337–379, (1996)
 Bragin V.O., Vagaitsev V.I., Kuznetsov N.V., Leonov G.A., "Algorithms for Finding Hidden Oscillations in Nonlinear Systems. The Aizerman and Kalman Conjectures and Chua's Circuits", Journal of Computer and Systems Sciences International 50(5):511–543, (2011) ( doi: 10.1134/S106423071104006X)
 Leonov G.A., Kuznetsov N.V., "Hidden attractors in dynamical systems. From hidden oscillations in Hilbert-Kolmogorov, Aizerman, and Kalman problems to hidden chaotic attractor in Chua circuits", International Journal of Bifurcation and Chaos 23(1): art. no. 1330002, (2013) (doi: 10.1142/S0218127413300024)

Disproved conjectures
Stability theory
Fixed points (mathematics)
Theorems in dynamical systems